Robert Honywood ( 1676 – January 1735) was an English politician who sat in the House of Commons as Member of Parliament (MP) for Essex between 1716 and 1727. He served as vice-admiral of Essex from 1715 until his death in 1735.

Honywood was the first son of Charles Ludovic Honywood and Mary  Clement; his brother was Sir Philip Honywood. He was also the grandson of Sir Robert Honywood, MP for New Romney, and a direct descendant of Mary Honywood.

A Whig, Honywood was elected Member of Parliament (MP) for Essex in 1716 after the result of the by-election in 1715 was reversed on petition, and held the seat until 1727.

Honywood married Mary Sandford, daughter of Sir Richard Sandford, 2nd Baronet, and sister of Sir Richard Sandford, 3rd Baronet. He inherited the Marks Hall estate from his distant cousin  John Lamotte Honywood upon the remarriage of his widow.  He had several children, including Richard, who inherited the estate, and Philip, who inherited the estate following the death of Richard's son, Richard.

See also
Honywood

References

17th-century births
1735 deaths
Members of the Parliament of Great Britain for English constituencies
Whig (British political party) MPs for English constituencies
British MPs 1715–1722
British MPs 1722–1727
Members of the Parliament of the United Kingdom for English constituencies